The Noon Universe (Russian term: "Мир Полудня" or "Мир Полдня" – "World of Noon"; also known as the “Wanderers’ Universe”) is a fictional future setting for a number of hard science fiction novels written by Arkady and Boris Strugatsky. The universe is named after Noon: 22nd Century, chronologically the first novel from the series.

According to Arkady Strugatsky, at first, the brothers did not make a conscious effort to create a fictional universe. Rather, they reused characters and settings from prior works whenever they found it convenient. It wasn't until later that they began drawing on common themes and plot threads from various novels to create newer works.

Description 
The victory of communism and the advance of technological progress on the Earth of the Noon Universe has resulted in an over-abundance of resources and eliminated the need for most types of manual labor.

Mankind is capable of near-instantaneous interstellar travel. Earth's social organization is presumably  communist, and can be described as a highly technologically advanced  anarchistic meritocracy. There is no state structure, no institutionalized coercion (no police etc.), yet functioning of the society is safeguarded by raising everyone as responsible individuals, with the guidance of a set of High Councils accepted by everyone in each particular field of activity.

One of the controversial occupations is that of the progressors - agents embedded in less-advanced humanoid civilizations in order to accelerate their development or to resolve their problems. Progressors' methods range from rescuing local scientists and artists to overthrowing local governments.

The main governing body is the World Council, composed of the brightest scientists, historians, doctors and teachers. Local matters are handled by the regional versions of the council. Planetary councils are present on each Earth colony (e.g.  Rainbow), as well, although "colony" in this context refers to a planet that wasn't home to any sentient life before the arrival of Terran settlers. In the Noon Universe, Earth has never attempted to seize permanent control over any other civilization.

The universe is populated by a number of sentient races. Some of them are humanoid, while others are so alien that humanity didn't realize that they were sentient for decades. Several sentient races maintain diplomatic relations with Earth's society. Many planets in the Noon Universe are inhabited by races identical to humans in all but minor genetic differences. It has been speculated that they were humans who wound up on other worlds due to the manipulations of the Wanderers (as Beetle in the Anthill shows, that is hardly unprecedented).

The Wanderers are the most mysterious race in the Noon Universe. Technologically advanced and highly secretive, the Wanderers are suspected of manipulating sentient beings throughout Noon Universe for their own purposes. While those purposes remain unclear, it is hinted that they try to "progress" various sentient beings, including the human race.

Works 
These works by the Strugatsky brothers are set in the Noon Universe (listed chronologically):

 Noon: 22nd Century (Полдень. XXII век, first published 1961)
 Escape Attempt (Попытка к бегству)
 Far Rainbow (Далекая Радуга)
 Hard to Be a God (Трудно быть богом)
 Disquiet (Беспокойство) – the initial variant of the Snail on the Slope (Улитка на склоне) 
 Prisoners of Power (The Inhabited Island) (Обитаемый остров)
 Space Mowgli (Малыш)
 The Kid from Hell (Парень из преисподней)
 Beetle in the Anthill (Жук в муравейнике)
 The Time Wanderers (Волны гасят ветер)

There are loose connections to early stories The Land of Crimson Clouds ("Страна багровых туч"), The Way to Amalthea ("Путь на Амальтею"), Space Apprentice ("Стажеры"), The Final Circle of Paradise (through Ivan Zhilin), Ispytanie SKIBR, Chastnye predpolozheniya, mainly through Bykovs family.

In the early 1990s the Strugatsky brothers began writing what they intended to be a final Noon Universe novel. It would have tied up some of the plot threads that were left unresolved in previous novels. However, following the death of Arkady Strugatsky, the surviving brother, Boris, felt that he could not bring himself to finish the novel. The book should have been named White Ferz. "Ferz" or "Vizier" is the Russian term for a Queen in chess. The Strugatsky brothers planned the book as a direct sequel of Prisoners of Power following the story of infiltration of the progressor Maxim Kammerer into the elite of the Island Empire.

In the late 1990s, a collection of fiction by notable Russian scifi writers, titled The Time of the Apprentices, was published in Russia (with an endorsement of Boris Strugatsky). The pieces in the collection build upon Strugatskys' ideas and works, and many of them are set in the Noon Universe. The same period saw the re-release of all Noon Universe novels as part of the Worlds of Strugatsky Brothers series. This re-release is notable for introductory articles written by literary critics from the perspective of Noon Universe historians looking back on the events of the said novels several decades later.

 Personalities 
 Lev Abalkin (Абалкин, Лев)
 Leonid Gorbovsky (Горбовcкий, Леонид)
 Maxim Kammerer (Каммерер, Максим)
 Gennady Komov (Комов, Геннадий)
 Rudolf Sikorski (Сикорски, Рудольф)
 Maya Glumova (Глумова, Майя)

 Planets 

 Ark (Ковчег): described in Space Mowgli; a barren world very similar to Earth in all aspects except the biosphere. The latter is unbelievably poor: for example, the oceans of the planet are empty (no fish, no algae, no mammals) although quite suitable for protein life. This planet was chosen by progressors as a refuge and a new home for the population of Pant, a planet in danger of a global natural catastrophe. The name was given after the biblical Ark built by Noah. It was initially planned to gradually change the biosphere of Ark to make it more similar to the pantian one and then transfer all Pantians to their new home. Considering the low technological advancement level of Pantians, they should not have noticed anything at all. But this plan was canceled when the non-humanoid native civilization of Ark (Megaforms) was discovered. It isn't stated anywhere in Strugatsky's books whether the "Ark Project" (started in 2160 AD) was ever completed and how. The local civilization of Ark is nearly as enigmatic as Wanderers. An official contact with them was never established although the Ark Megaforms employed a human agent to communicate with progressors working on the surface of Ark. This agent was Piere "The Kid" Semyonov, a 13-year-old human whose parents died in 2147 when their spaceship "Pilgrim" was shot down by Wanderers' satellite. Although Megaforms negotiated (through their agent) to drive progressors away from their home world, no further attempt to share technologies or cultural developments was registered.
 Arkanar (Арканар): the setting of the novel Hard to Be a God.
 Blue sands planet: the planet visited by the spaceship Taimyr, which returned in 2117.
 Earth (Земля)
 Garrota (Гаррота): the home planet of Garrotian snails''' (слизни Гарроты), a non-humanoid alien race that took humans  and their technology for a product of their own imagination. This planet is briefly mentioned in Space Mowgli and no further information about either the race or the planet is available.
 Giganda (Гиганда): a planet populated by humans whose technological advancement is roughly equal to that of Saraksh inhabitants. For a long time the two superpowers of the planet, Alai Duchy and the Empire, were drawn into a total war conflict that has been put an end to only when Earth's progressors started an undercover anti-war activity in 2177 AD. Apparently, no country possessed nuclear weapons. One of the planet's natives, a foot soldier of the Alai Duchy was taken to Earth and introduced to its advanced society. Despite repeated efforts to integrate him, he failed to adjust. He was then returned to Giganda. Discovered in 2136 AD.
 Gorgona: the planet where the Stepchild Thomas Nielsen died in 2165, possibly a suicide.
 Hope (Надежда): described briefly in Beetle in the Anthill, it is another planet populated by humans whose technological advancement is roughly equal to that of Earth in the 20th century. Approximately in 2123 AD, a massive ecological catastrophe (probably, a man-made one) devastated the planet causing its inhabitants to age at an unnatural pace after the twelfth year of life. Wanderers, apparently believing that a new, clean environment is the cure, have transported most of the population of Hope to an unknown planet using some sort of enhanced intraplanetar transport ("null-T"), but few people decided to remain and became a subject of a consequent hunt by Wanderers (through a sophisticated system of traps, especially for children). Discovered in 2162 AD.
 Leonida (Леонида): the home planet of Leoniders, a humanoid alien race that lives in a perfect symbiosis with the planet's biosphere. Leonida is located in EN-23 system, its only moon is called Palmyra (Пальмира) and its day-night cycle lasts a bit longer than 27 hours. This planet was apparently the first one with an Earth-like climate suitable for humans' existence. Perhaps, the planet was named after its discoverer, Leonid Gorbovsky. Discovered in 2133 AD.
 Mars: this solar planet featured in the Noon Universe. Mars bears complex forms of indigenous plant and animal life, though none sentient. It also bears many artifacts of an ancient supercivilization, assumed to be remnants of the Wanderers. An abandoned city sits at the North pole, and the moons Phobos and Deimos are discovered to be artificial satellites constructed by the Wanderers.
 Pandora (Пандора): a planet wide holiday resort. It is mostly covered with jungle swarming with dangerous alien fauna (like crayfish-spiders or tahorgs) young people just love to hunt. Every year dozens of people are killed or seriously injured on Pandora despite countless safety measures by Earth's government. No local sentient species registered. Pandora is apparently located in a system with two suns. Pandora's skies were a training ground for Headies, when humans shared the space-traveling technologies with them during the "Headies in Space" project. Discovered before 2119 AD (exact date unknown)
 Pant (Панта): a planet endangered by a global catastrophe – an explosion of its own sun as a part of standard stellar evolution. Unfortunately, there were sentient species identical to humans on the planet and so they had to be deported from it ("Ark Project") to another one. The first choice was Ark but since the discovery of a sentient alien race there, progressors have apparently changed their mind. Discovered approx. in 2161 AD.
 Rainbow (Радуга): setting of the novel Far Rainbow.
 Ruzhena (Ружена): an Earth-like planet in VK-71016 system. Valentin Petrov, the leader of the expedition that discovered it, named the planet after his wife, Ruzhena Naskova, but the planet wasn't really hospitable: two members of the spaceship crew perished on it and Petrov himself lost an arm. Ruzhena is described in "Частные предположения", a book that's been never translated in English and contains only a vague connection to the Noon Universe
 Saraksh (Саракш): the setting of the novel Prisoners of Power.
 Saula (Саула): the setting of the novel An Attempt to Escape
 Tagora (Тагора): the home planet of Tagorians, a lizard-like alien race, the first one Earth's ever contacted with. It is mentioned in An Attempt to Escape that there is a human resident (or spy) on Tagora whose name is presumably Benny Durov (Бенни Дуров) and he is a progressor working under cover to study Tagorian technology. Discovered in the end of 21st century although a full scaled contact was established in 2122 AD.
 Tissa (Тисса): a planet in EN-63061 system. It is famous mostly for an incident that happened shortly after a Freelance Search Group (FSG) expedition discovered it. For some reason the members of the group couldn't establish a radio connection to any human world or spaceship except for their own mothership on the orbit of Tissa, and its computers kept telling them that Earth and all other human settlements were destroyed by global catastrophes and that they are the only remaining humans in the Universe. After the group was rescued, psychologists decided that this was a case of temporary madness or a mass suggestion. Tissa is only mentioned in The Time Wanderers. Discovered in 2193 AD.
 Vladislava (Владислава): the first planet (apart from Mars) where Wanderers' traces were found (artificial satellites and an abandoned city). Apart from that, the planet is known for its extremely turbulent atmosphere conquered only by famous Leonid Gorbovsky. Despite that, there is some protein life on the planet although no sentient one. Vladislava is located in EN-17 solar system. Discovered in 2121 AD.
 Yaila (Яйла): an even harsher and more dangerous version of Pandora. Infamous for its monstrous fauna (e.g. Yaila Dragon, presumably, a reptile with an enormous regeneration potential) and its impenetrable jungle and swamps it is considered by many to be just another planet-wide resort, but generally only the toughest and most experienced hunters dare to visit Yaila.

Races 
The following sentient species are depicted:
 Ark Megaforms (негуманоиды Ковчега)
 Garrotian Snails (слизни Гарроты)
 Golovans (Голованы)
 Humans (люди)
 Ludens (людены)
 Leoniders (леонидяне)
 Tagorians (тагоряне)
 Wanderers (Странники)

Other possibly sentient species mentioned in the books are septoids (see Noon: 22nd Century) whose sentience is not really confirmed, semi-sentient prehistoric molluscs katapumoridako (see The Time Wanderers) and the unidentified sentient creature killed by Pol Gnedykh in the Kroox solar system (Noon: 22nd Century).

Reception, analysis and influence 
The setting is a future utopia that gets gradually deconstructed as the authors become disillusioned with the Soviet Union, moving away from the "technological optimism... depicting a quasi-Marxist perfection" to address the failures of the Soviet society. In writing about the Noon Universe, Strugatsky brothers have been argued to have created their own utopian ideology, or "amateur personal metaphysics", based on the primacy of science, not unlike more modern view of transhumanism.

It has been suggested that James Cameron's Avatar's lush jungle planet has been inspired by Noon Universe's planet Pandora.

The Noon Universe human civilization has been described as techno-patriarchal, and some of the antagonists as eco-matriarchal.

A number of authors wrote works based on the extension of Strugatskys' ideas. Several of them arranged a project  and published several anthologies under this umbrella title, followed by several similar projects.

Footnotes

External links 
  History of Noon Universe
  Noon Universe character bios, history, alien races list and trivia
 

 
Future history
Fictional universes